SM-Trax is an electronic duo from Germany consisting of producers Stefan Grunwald and Mirko von Schlieffen.  In mid-1999 they went to #1 on the Hot Dance Music/Club Play chart with "Got the Groove", released on Groovilicious Records.

Trax eventually went on produce "SM Trax is Calling", which features a very distinctive beat. The lyrics discuss the nature of house music, while the chorus features a repeated "Wake up, SM Trax is in the club" line. SM Trax is Calling was featured on the 2005 techno album Radikal Techno 6.

Career 
In 1997, the duo released the single Climb on Top along with American singer Sweet Pussy Pauline (Candice Jordan). The song peaked at number 63 in the German singles chart and stayed in those charts for six weeks. In 1999, the single Got the Groove was released, which reached #1 on Billboard Dance Club Songs in the United States. In Germany, the song reached number 58 in the official single charts. The follow-up single ...Is Calling reached number 57. In 2000, SM-Trax were able to enter the German single charts again with the single At the Club. In the same year von Schlieffen left the music project. The last release dates back to 2004.

See also
List of number-one dance hits (United States)
List of artists who reached number one on the US Dance chart

References

German house music groups
German electronic music groups
German dance music groups